Kim Magnusson (born 31 August 1992) is a Swedish professional road racing cyclist, who currently rides for UCI Continental team . He had been a member of UCI WorldTeam  in 2018, initially signing a two-year contract, but left the team after only one season.

His father, Glenn Magnusson, also competed as a professional road racing cyclist between 1996 and 2001, winning three stages at the Giro d'Italia.

Major results
2017
 1st  Road race, National Road Championships
 5th Kalmar Grand Prix
 8th Overall East Bohemia Tour
2018
 5th Road race, National Road Championships
2020
 1st  Road race, National Road Championships
2021
 6th Overall Kreiz Breizh Elites

References

External links

Team profile

1992 births
Living people
Swedish male cyclists
People from Skövde Municipality
Sportspeople from Västra Götaland County
20th-century Swedish people
21st-century Swedish people